Gajówka may refer to the following places in Poland:
Gajówka, Lower Silesian Voivodeship (south-west Poland)
Gajówka, Opole Voivodeship (south-west Poland)
Gajówka, Kuyavian-Pomeranian Voivodeship (north-central Poland)
Gajówka, Podlaskie Voivodeship (north-east Poland)
Gajówka, Subcarpathian Voivodeship (south-east Poland)
Gajówka, Greater Poland Voivodeship (west-central Poland)
Gajówka, Gliwice County in Silesian Voivodeship (south Poland)
Gajówka, Warmian-Masurian Voivodeship (north Poland)